Hard Ticket to Hawaii is a 1987 American action film written and directed by Andy Sidaris, and starring Ronn Moss, Dona Speir, Hope Marie Carlton, Cynthia Brimhall, and Harold Diamond. It is the second installment in the Triple B series and was released on DVD on 23 October 2001. This movie stars several Playboy Playmates: Dona Speir (Miss March 1984), Hope Marie Carlton (Miss July 1985), Cynthia Brimhall (Miss October 1985), and Patty Duffek (Miss May 1984).

Plot
Two drug enforcement agents are killed on a private Hawaiian island. Donna and Taryn, two operatives for The Agency (Molokai Cargo), accidentally intercept a delivery of diamonds intended for drug lord Seth Romero, who takes exception and tries to get them back. Soon other Agency operatives get involved, and a full-scale fight to the finish ensues, complicated here and there by a very dangerous snake infected by deadly toxins from cancer-infested rats.

Cast
 Ronn Moss as Rowdy Abilene
 Dona Speir as Donna
 Hope Marie Carlton as Taryn
 Cynthia Brimhall as Edy
 Wolf Larson as J.J. Jackson
 Harold Diamond as Jade
 Yukon King as Cat

Reception
The film has a cult following due to its over-the-top violence, cheesy dialogue, unintentional humor, and overall absurdity. In 2014, Paste magazine named the film the "best B movie of all time."

The film was featured on the podcast How Did This Get Made? in 2017.

References

External links
 
 
 Piège Mortel à Hawaï on NanarLand

1987 films
1980s action adventure films
1980s spy action films
American spy action films
American action adventure films
Films directed by Andy Sidaris
1980s English-language films
1980s American films